Justin Harwood is a New Zealand bass guitarist, notable for his work with several indie rock bands of the 1980s and 1990s, The Chills, Luna, and Tuatara. He worked alongside New Zealand's Martin Phillipps (The Chills), Dean Wareham (Galaxie 500, Luna), and Peter Buck (R.E.M., Tuatara).

Early life 
Harwood was born in Taradale, New Zealand.

Career 
Harwood was a member of the Chills from 1986 to 1990, during which time they had their biggest commercial success with the singles I Love My Leather Jacket (a New Zealand top 5 single) and Heavenly Pop Hit, which went to number 17 on the U.S. modern rock chart). During this time, The Chills also performed before their largest audience ever. They drew 60,000 people at the 1987 Glastonbury Festival.

After leaving The Chills, Harwood moved to New York City, where he became a founding member of Luna. In 1996, Harwood joined forces with several noted members of indie rock groups to form a side-project, the semi-experimental band Tuatara - named, at Harwood's suggestion, after a type of reptile from his native New Zealand.

Filmography 
 2013-2016: High Road (TV series short) – Writer, Director, Editor, Composer
 2017: Wilde Ride (TV series) – Writer, Director
 2019: The Chills: The Triumph and Tragedy of Martin Phillipps (Documentary) – self

Works and publications

References

External links 
 
 
 

New Zealand bass guitarists
Male bass guitarists
Living people
The Minus 5 members
Tuatara (band) members
Luna (1990s American band) members
The Chills members
Year of birth missing (living people)
People from Taradale, New Zealand
New Zealand male guitarists
New Zealand guitarists